Aquimarina spongiae  is a bacterium from the genus of Aquimarina which has been isolated from the sponge Halichondria oshoro from the coastal area of Jeju in Korea.

References

External links
Type strain of Aquimarina spongiae at BacDive -  the Bacterial Diversity Metadatabase	

Flavobacteria
Bacteria described in 2011